The National Health Service (NHS) is the umbrella term for the publicly funded healthcare systems of the United Kingdom (UK). Since 1948, they have been funded out of general taxation. There are three systems which are referred to using the "NHS" name (NHS England, NHS Scotland and NHS Wales). Health and Social Care in Northern Ireland was created separately and is often locally referred to as "the NHS". The four systems were established in 1948 as part of major social reforms following the Second World War. The founding principles were that services should be comprehensive, universal and free at the point of delivery—a health service based on clinical need, not ability to pay. Each service provides a comprehensive range of health services, free at the point of use for people ordinarily resident in the United Kingdom apart from dental treatment and optical care. In England, NHS patients have to pay prescription charges; some, such as those aged over 60 and certain state benefit recipients, are exempt.

Taken together, the four National Health Services in 2015–16 employed around 1.6 million people with a combined budget of £136.7 billion. In 2014, the total health sector workforce across the United Kingdom was 2,165,043. This broke down into 1,789,586 in England, 198,368 in Scotland, 110,292 in Wales and 66,797 in Northern Ireland. In 2017, there were 691,000 nurses registered in the United Kingdom, down 1,783 from the previous year. However, this is the first time nursing numbers have fallen since 2008. Every 24 hours it sees one million patients, and with 1.7 million staff it is the fifth biggest employer in the world, as well as the largest non-military public organisation in the world.

When purchasing drugs, the four healthcare services have significant market power that, based on their own assessment of the fair value of the drugs, influences the global price, typically keeping prices lower. A small number of products are procured jointly by two or more UK healthcare services. Several other countries either copy the United Kingdom’s model or directly rely on Britain’s assessments for their own decisions on state-financed drug reimbursements.

History

Calls for a "unified medical service" can be dated back to the Minority Report of the Royal Commission on the Poor Law in 1909.

Somerville Hastings, President of the Socialist Medical Association, successfully proposed a resolution at the 1934 Labour Party Conference that the party should be committed to the establishment of a State Health Service.

Following the 1942 Beveridge Report's recommendation to create "comprehensive health and rehabilitation services for prevention and cure of disease", cross-party consensus emerged on introducing a National Health Service of some description. Conservative MP and Health Minister, Henry Willink later advanced this notion of a National Health Service in 1944 with his consultative White Paper "A National Health Service" which was circulated in full and short versions to colleagues, as well as in newsreel.

When Clement Attlee's Labour Party won the 1945 election he appointed Aneurin Bevan as Health Minister. Bevan then embarked upon what the official historian of the NHS, Charles Webster, called an "audacious campaign" to take charge of the form the NHS finally took. Bevan's National Health Service was proposed in Westminster legislation for England and Wales from 1946 and Scotland from 1947, and the Northern Ireland Parliament's Public Health Services Act 1947.
NHS Wales was split from NHS (England) in 1969 when control was passed to the Secretary of State for Wales. According to one history of the NHS, "In some respects the war had made things easier. In anticipation of massive air raid casualties, the Emergency Medical Service had brought the country’s municipal and voluntary hospitals into one umbrella organisation, showing that a national hospital service was possible." Webster wrote in 2002 that "the Luftwaffe achieved in months what had defeated politicians and planners for at least two decades."

The NHS was born out of the ideal that healthcare should be available to all, regardless of wealth. Although being freely accessible regardless of wealth maintained Henry Willink's principle of free healthcare for all, Conservative MPs were in favour of maintaining local administration of the NHS through existing arrangements with local authorities fearing that an NHS which owned hospitals on a national scale would lose the personal relationship between doctor and patient.

Conservative MPs voted in favour of their amendment to Bevan's Bill to maintain local control and ownership of hospitals and against Bevan's plan for national ownership of all hospitals. The Labour government defeated Conservative amendments and went ahead with the NHS as it remains today; a single large national organisation (with devolved equivalents) which forced the transfer of ownership of hospitals from local authorities and charities to the new NHS. Bevan's principle of ownership with no private sector involvement has since been diluted, with later Labour governments implementing large scale financing arrangements with private builders in private finance initiatives and joint ventures.

At its launch by Bevan on 5 July 1948 it had at its heart three core principles: That it meet the needs of everyone, that it be free at the point of delivery, and that it be based on clinical need, not ability to pay.

Three years after the founding of the NHS, Bevan resigned from the Labour government in opposition to the introduction of charges for the provision of dentures, dentists, and glasses; resigning in support was fellow minister and future Prime Minister Harold Wilson. The following year, Winston Churchill's Conservative government introduced prescription fees. However, Wilson's government abolished them in 1965; they were later re-introduced but with exemptions for those on low income. These charges were the first of many controversies over changes to the NHS throughout its history.

From its earliest days, the cultural history of the NHS has shown its place in British society reflected and debated in film, TV, cartoons and literature. The NHS had a prominent slot during the 2012 London Summer Olympics opening ceremony directed by Danny Boyle, being described as "the institution which more than any other unites our nation".

Eligibility for treatment

Everyone living in the UK can use the NHS without being asked to pay the full cost of the service, though NHS dentistry and optometry do have standard charges in each of the four national health services in the UK. In addition, most patients in England have to pay charges for prescriptions though some patients are exempted.

Aneurin Bevan, in considering the provision of NHS services to overseas visitors wrote, in 1952, that it would be "unwise as well as mean to withhold the free service from the visitor to Britain. How do we distinguish a visitor from anybody else? Are British citizens to carry means of identification everywhere to prove that they are not visitors? For if the sheep are to be separated from the goats both must be classified. What began as an attempt to keep the Health Service for ourselves would end by being a nuisance to everybody."

The provision of free treatment to non-UK-residents, formerly interpreted liberally, has been increasingly restricted, with new overseas visitor hospital charging regulations introduced in 2015.

Citizens of the EU holding a valid European Health Insurance Card and persons from certain other countries with which the UK has reciprocal arrangements concerning health care can get emergency treatment without charge.

The NHS is free at the point of use, for general practitioner (GP) and emergency treatment not including admission to hospital, to non-residents. People with the right to medical care in European Economic Area (EEA) nations are also entitled to free treatment by using the European Health Insurance Card. Those from other countries with which the UK has reciprocal arrangements also qualify for free treatment. Since 6 April 2015, non-EEA nationals who are subject to immigration control must have the immigration status of indefinite leave to remain at the time of treatment and be properly settled, to be considered ordinarily resident. People not ordinarily resident in the UK are in general not entitled to free hospital treatment, with some exceptions such as refugees.

People not ordinarily resident may be subject to an interview to establish their eligibility, which must be resolved before non-emergency treatment can commence. Patients who do not qualify for free treatment are asked to pay in advance or to sign a written undertaking to pay, except for emergency treatment.

People from outside the EEA coming to the UK for a temporary stay of more than six months are required to pay an immigration health surcharge at the time of visa application, and will then be entitled to NHS treatment on the same basis as a resident. This includes overseas students with a visa to study at a recognised institution for 6 months or more, but not visitors on a tourist visa. In 2016 the surcharge was £200 per year, with exemptions and reductions in some cases. This was increased to £400 in 2018. The discounted rate for students and those on the Youth Mobility Scheme will increase from £150 to £300.

From 15 January 2007, anyone who is working outside the UK as a missionary for an organisation with its principal place of business in the UK is fully exempt from NHS charges for services that would normally be provided free of charge to those resident in the UK. This is regardless of whether they derive a salary or wage from the organisation, or receive any type of funding or assistance from the organisation for the purposes of working overseas. This is in recognition of the fact that most missionaries would be unable to afford private health care and those working in developing countries should not effectively be penalised for their contribution to development and other work.

Those who are not ordinarily resident (including British citizens who may have paid National Insurance contributions in the past) are liable to charges for services.

There are some other categories of people who are exempt from the residence requirements such as specific government workers and those in the armed forces stationed overseas.

Historical issues

Funding

In 2016 the systems were 98.8% funded from general taxation and National Insurance contributions, plus small amounts from patient charges for some services. As of 2016, about 10% of GDP was spent on health and was the most spent in the public sector. In 2019, the UK spent roughly 10.2% of GDP on healthcare compared to 11.7% in Germany and 11.1% in France. The money to pay for the NHS comes directly from taxation. The 2008/09 budget roughly equated to a contribution of £1,980 per person in the UK. Some 60% of the NHS budget is used to pay staff. A further 20% pays for drugs and other supplies, with the remaining 20% split between buildings, equipment, training costs, medical equipment, catering and cleaning. Nearly 80% of the total budget is distributed by local trusts in line with the particular health priorities in their areas.

When the NHS was launched in 1948 it had a budget of £437 million (equivalent to £ billion in ). In 2016–2017, the budget was £122.5 billion. In 1955/56 health spending was 11.2% of the public services budget. In 2015/16 it was 29.7%. This equates to an average rise in spending over the full 60-year period of about 4% a year once inflation has been taken into account. Under the Blair government spending levels increased by around 6% a year on average. Between 2010 and 2017 spending growth was constrained to just over 1% a year. A 2019 report said that a study by the 'Centre for Health Economics' at the University of York found that between 2004/05 and 2016/17 the productivity of the NHS has increased nearly two and a half times as quickly as the larger economy.

Between 2010 and 2017, there was a cap of 1% on pay rises for staff continuing in the same role. Unions representing doctors, dentists, nurses and other health professionals have called on the government to end the cap on health service pay, claiming the cap is damaging the health service and damaging patient care. In 2017, the pay rise was likely to be below the level of inflation and to mean a real-terms pay cut. In 2017, the House of Commons Library research predicted that that real-terms NHS funding per head was to fall in 2018–19, and stay the same for two years afterwards.

In January 2018, The Guardian reported that GPs faced excessive workloads throughout Britain and that this put the GP's health and that of their patients at risk. The Royal College of Physicians surveyed doctors across the UK, with two-thirds maintaining patient safety had deteriorated during the year to 2018: 80% feared they would be unable to provide safe patient care in the coming year while 84% felt increased pressure on the NHS was demoralising the workforce. In June 2018, at a time when the NHS was short of doctors, foreign doctors were forced to leave the UK due to visa restrictions. A study reported in November 2018 found that a fifth of doctors had faced bullying from seniors in the previous year due to pressure at work.

In May 2018 it was reported that the NHS was under-resourced compared to health provisions in other developed nations. A King’s Fund study of OECD data from 21 nations, revealed that the NHS has among the lowest numbers of doctors, nurses and hospital beds per capita in the western world. In May 2018, it was said that nurses within the NHS said that patient care was compromised by the shortage of nurses and the lack of experienced nurses with the necessary qualifications. In June 2018 it was reported that the NHS performed below average in preventing deaths from cancer, strokes and heart disease. 

In September 2018 it was reported that staff shortages at histology departments were delaying diagnosis and start of treatment for cancer patients. In England and Scotland cancer wards and children's wards have to close because the hospital cannot attract sufficient qualified doctors and nurses to run the wards safely. In November 2018 it was reported that cancer patients and child patients were having to travel very long distances to get treatment and their relatives had to travel far to visit the patients. In wards which had not closed staff sometimes worked under stress due to staff shortages. It was also predicted then, that Brexit was likely to aggravate those problems. In November 2019, it was reported that due to the shortage of nurses the NHS was then relying on less qualified staff like healthcare assistants and nursing associates.

For the period between 2010 and 2018 the Health Foundation funded research by Birmingham University said there was insufficient and falling NHS capital spending that put patient care and put staff productivity at risk. The Health Foundation said that £3.5 billion more a year would be required to get capital spending to the OECD average. Spending limits were effecting service efficiency, and patient care. Shortages of equipment and equipment failures had an impact as did relying on ageing diagnostic equipment.

In September 2019 it was reported that cancer survival rates in the UK had been rising fast but probably still lagged behind the best results internationally, mainly because of late diagnosis. In March 2019 it was reported that death rates from breast cancer were falling faster in Britain than in any other of the six largest countries in Europe, and were estimated then to have improved beyond the European average. In October 2018, according to Breast Cancer Care, 72% of NHS trusts across the UK did not provide dedicated specialist nurses for patients with incurable breast cancer." 

In September 2019 it was reported that Cancer Research UK maintained that more NHS cancer personnel were needed to enable the UK to catch up The NHS in England was expanding early diagnosis services with the goal of increasing the proportion of cancers diagnosed early (at stages 1 and 2) from 53% to 75% in the decade to 2028. In September 2018, it was reported that the NHS was the first health service in Europe to negotiate coverage for novel CAR-T cancer therapy, with agreement reached within 10 days of its European marketing authorisation.

In 2018, British Prime Minister Theresa May announced that NHS in England would receive a 3.4% increase in funding every year to 2024, which would allow it to receive an extra £20bn a year in real terms funding. There is concern that a high proportion of this money will go to service NHS debts rather than for improved patient care. In June 2018 it was reported that there were calls for the government to write off the NHS debt. Saffron Cordery of NHS Providers said that hospitals needed help to do their work without being up in deficit, as two-thirds were in the year to 2018. It was also said that some expressed doubt over whether May could carry out this proposed increase in funding. The next day, Health Secretary Jeremy Hunt backed the extra £20bn annual increase in NHS funding and responded to criticism by stating that taxation would be used to carry out the funding and that details would be revealed at the next budget.

In June 2018 it was reported that the Institute for Fiscal Studies had stated a 5% real-terms increase was needed for real change. Paul Johnson of the IFS said the 3.4% was greater than recent increases, but less than the long-term average. In July 2016, health experts said the money would "help stem further decline in the health service, but it's simply not enough to address the fundamental challenges facing the NHS, or fund essential improvements to services that are flagging." In November 2018, it was thought that inflation may erode the real value of this funding increase.

As part of the 2018 funding increase the UK Government asked the NHS in England to produce a 10-year plan as to how this funding would be used. On 7 January 2019, the NHS England published the NHS Long Term Plan.

In March 2022, Rishi Sunak doubled the annual efficiency target for the NHS in England. The 2.2 per cent target would deliver annual savings of saving of £4.75 billion. At the same time the additional Covid funding is being removed in 2022–23. At the same time Sir Charles Bean, recently leader of the Office for Budget Responsibility said that "the rising trend in health and social care spending and pensions will be adding something like another £75 billion spending over the next five years, £150 billion, potentially over the next decade" as if treatments are available to keep people alive longer, then people will want them.

The Guardian reported that data for 2020 suggests a change, and that the doctors' trade union and professional association, the BMA, say this was largely due to raised spending during the pandemic and the effect of Covid on the whole economy, since the GDP of the UK dropped more than that of all other G7 nations. The BMA also said in December 2022 that the NHS experienced "historical underfunding and under-resourcing" during the ten years before COVID. The King's Fund maintains The investment in services started in 2021 was badly needed, but despite it restoring key services and performance standards will require years. Shortages of workers and growing staff numbers experiencing burnout and thinking of leaving the NHS may stop progress.  If the new funding is to be efficiently used the NHS will need a comprehensive and fully funded workforce strategy to ensure future supply of staff.

In July 2022, The Telegraph reported that Civitas found that health spending was costing about £10,000 per household in the UK. This, they said, reflected the third highest share of GDP of any nation in Europe. This was said to show that the UK "has one of the most costly health systems – and some of the worst outcomes". The findings were made before the government increased health spending significantly, with a 1.25% increase in National Insurance, in April 2022. Civitas said this showed evidence "runaway" spending as health spending in the UK had increased by more than any country despite the significant drop in national income due to the Covid pandemic.

Staffing

The United Kingdom's exit from the European Union will affect physicians from EU countries, about 11% of the physician workforce. A survey suggested 60% of these physicians were considering leaving. Record numbers of EU nationals (17,197 EU staff working in the NHS which include nurses and doctors) left in 2016. The figures, put together by NHS Digital, led to calls to reassure European workers over their future in the UK.

In June 2018, the Royal College of Physicians calculated that medical training places need to be increased from 7,500 to 15,000 by 2030 to take account of part-time working among other factors. At that time there were 47,800 consultants working in the UK of which 15,700 were physicians. About 20% of consultants work less than full-time.

A study by the Centre for Progressive Policy called for NHS trusts to become “exemplar employers” by improving social mobility and pay especially for those "trusts in poorer places where they can play a particularly large role in determining the economic wellbeing of the local population.” They found the NHS to be " a middle ranking employer in comparison to other large organisations and falls short on social mobility and the real Living Wage", and ranked trusts using a ‘good employer index’. Ambulance trusts were ranked worst.

In September 2021 the Daily Telegraph reported that "nearly half of all NHS staff have no medical qualifications", being managers, administrators or unqualified assistants.

On 6 June 2022, The Guardian said that a survey of more than 20,000 frontline staff by the nurses' trade union and professional body, the Royal College of Nursing, said that only a quarter of shifts had the planned number of registered nurses on duty. The Guardian said that the union's general secretary, in her keynote speech at their annual congress in Glasgow, was expected to say that large numbers of nurses are leaving the profession because they are demoralised and overworked, and that they had concerns over patient safety.

The NHS is facing a shortage of general practitioners. From 2015 to 2022, the number of GPs has fallen by 1,622. Some family doctors have 2,500 patients each, forcing patients to attend A&E instead. Certain regions have fewer than 50 GPs per 100,000 people, while other regions have more than 70, presenting a challenge to the NHS's founding principle of equal treatment. A growing number of family doctors are reporting unsustainable workloads, and many have chosen to work part-time. A Health and Social Care spokesperson said that the department is making 4,000 training positions available for GPs every year, which help create an extra 50 million appointments annually.

British exit from the European Union

There was a concern that a disorderly Brexit might have compromised patients' access to vital medicines. In February 2018 many medical organisations were planning for a worst-case Brexit scenario because "time is running out" for a transition deal to follow the UK’s formal exit, scheduled for March 2019. Pharmaceutical organisations working with the Civil Service to keep medicine supplies available in the case of a no-deal Brexit had to sign 26 Non-Disclosure Agreements (NDAs) to prevent them from giving the public information. The figures were given on 21 December 2018 after Rushanara Ali asked a parliamentary question. As negotiations continue between the UK and the EU as of 1 January 2021, vulnerable people needing treatment when working, living or travelling to the UK may lose out by not having access to NHS Care.

Rising social care costs
Social care will cost more in future according to research by Liverpool University, University College London, and others. Professor Helen Stokes-Lampard of the Royal College of GPs said:  "It's a great testament to medical research, and the NHS, that we are living longer – but we need to ensure that our patients are living longer with a good quality of life. For this to happen we need a properly funded, properly staffed health and social care sector with general practice, hospitals and social care all working together – and all communicating well with each other, in the best interests of delivering safe care to all our patients."

Mental health

Some patients have to wait excessively long for mental health care. The Royal College of Psychiatrists found that some patients must wait up to thirteen months for the right care. Wendy Burn of the Royal College of Psychiatrists said, “It is a scandal that patients are waiting so long for treatment. The failure to give people with mental illnesses the prompt help they need is ruining their lives.” Even patients who are suicidal or who have attempted suicide are sometimes denied treatment; patients are told they are not ill enough or waiting lists are too long. During very long waits for treatment, one in three patients deteriorate, and they may become unemployed or get divorced. One in four patients throughout the UK wait over three months to see an NHS mental health professional, with 6% waiting at least a year.

The National Audit Office found mental health provisions for children and young people will not meet growing demand, despite promises of increased funding. Even if promises to provide £1.4bn more for the sector are kept, there will be “significant unmet need” due to staff shortages, inadequate data and failure to control spending by NHS clinical commissioning groups. Currently one-quarter of young people needing mental health services can get NHS help. The Department of Health and Social Care hopes to raise the ratio to 35%. Efforts to improve mental health provisions could reveal previously unmet demand.

Meg Hillier of the select committee on public accounts said: "The government currently estimates that less than a third of children and young people with a diagnosable mental health condition are receiving treatment. But the government doesn’t understand how many children and young people are in need of treatment or how funding is being spent locally. The government urgently needs to set out how departments, and national and local bodies, are going to work together to achieve its long-term ambition.” Amyas Morse said, “Current targets to improve care are modest and even if met would still mean two-thirds of those who need help are not seen. Rising estimates of demand may indicate that the government is even further away than it thought."

In response, NHS England has embarked on a major programme to expand mental health services, whose budgets are now growing faster than the NHS overall. MIND the mental health charity responded saying: "We are pleased that the plan includes a commitment of £2.3bn a year towards mental health, to help redress the balance. The plan promises that this money will see around two million more people with anxiety, depression and other mental health problems receive help, including new parents, and 24 hour access to crisis care. The plan also includes a guarantee that investment in primary, community and mental health care will grow faster than the growing overall NHS budget so that different parts of the NHS come together to provide better, joined-up care in partnership with local government. Since the funding announcement in the summer, Mind has been working with the NHS, Government and voluntary sector to help shape the long term plan. This longer-term strategy was developed in consultation with people with mental health problems to ensure their views are reflected."

Medicines

In November 2019 unprecedented shortages of some medicines developed. Drugs to treat cancer, heart disease, Parkinson's disease, mental health conditions, some eye conditions, antibiotics for tuberculosis and drugs to control epilepsy were among those in short supply. It was reported that life saving drugs would have to be rationed and not all patients who need them would get them. Some patients could be switched onto other drugs, but other patients could not be switched to alternative drugs. Many problems can impact the supply chain, like IT failure, speculators stockpiling drugs, alterations in regulation and sudden disease outbreaks. Tony O’Sullivan of Keep Our NHS Public said: "The Health Department’s guidance includes an unprecedented list of drugs unavailable or in short supply. Patients and clinicians alike should be on high alert when the advice includes how to 'share stocks' to make them last, to ‘prioritise’ patients already on specific treatments including cancer rather than a new patient and effectively how to ration so many vital drugs. Drug companies’ behaviour must be controlled. We must urgently protect the NHS from further risks of loss of control of drug prices and supplies from trade deals with the US and that requires returning it to a wholly public service."

Performance
Performance of the NHS is generally assessed separately at the level of England, Wales, Scotland and Northern Ireland. Since 2004 the Commonwealth Fund has produced surveys, "Mirror, Mirror on the Wall", comparing the performance of health systems in 11 wealthy countries in which the UK generally ranks highly. In the 2021 survey the NHS dropped from first overall to fourth as it had fallen in key areas, including ‘access to care and equity.’ The Euro Health Consumer Index attempted to rank the NHS against other European health systems from 2014 to 2018.  Civitas produced an International Health Care Outcomes Index in 2022 ranking the performance of the UK health care system against 18 similar, wealthy countries since 2000. It excluded the impact of the Covid-19 pandemic as data stopped in 2019. The UK was near the bottom of most tables except households who faced catastrophic health spending.

A comparative analysis of health care systems in 2010 put the NHS second in a study of seven rich countries. The report put the UK health systems above those of Germany, Canada and the US; the NHS was deemed the most efficient among those health systems studied.

A 2018 study by the King's Fund, Health Foundation, Nuffield Trust, and the Institute for Fiscal Studies to mark the NHS 70th anniversary concluded that the main weakness of the NHS was healthcare outcomes. Mortality for cancer, heart attacks and stroke, was higher than average among comparable countries. The NHS was doing well at protecting people from heavy financial costs when ill. Waiting times were about the same, and the management of longterm illness was better than in other comparable countries. Efficiency was good, with low administrative costs and high use of cheaper generic medicines. Twenty-nine hospital trusts and boards out of 157 had not met any waiting-time target in the year 2017–2018. The Office for National Statistics reported in January 2019 that productivity in the English NHS had been growing at 3%, considerably faster than across the rest of the UK economy.

In 2019, The Times, commenting on a study in the British Medical Journal, reported that "Britain spent the least on health, £3,000 per person, compared with an average of £4,400, and had the highest number of deaths that might have been prevented with prompt treatment". The BMJ study compared "the healthcare systems of other developed countries in spending, staff numbers and avoidable deaths".

Over 130,000 deaths since 2012 in the UK could have been prevented if progress in public health policy had not stopped due to austerity, analysis by the Institute for Public Policy Research found. Dean Hochlaf of the IPPR said: "We have seen progress in reducing preventable disease flatline since 2012."". The key NHS performance indicators (18 weeks (RTT), 4 hours (A&E) and cancer (2 week wait) have not been achieved since February 2016, July 2015 and December 2015 respectively.

Civitas published an International Health Care Outcomes Index in April 2022 comparing health care outcomes in global health systems across 19 comparable countries. It considered health spending, life expectancy, major disease outcomes and outcomes for treatable mortality and childbirth. Across 16 metrics with data to 2019 (or most recent available), the UK ranked at the bottom four times (stroke, heart attack and colon cancer survival), and in the bottom three eight times. No other comparable country had such a poor record. It was the best performer for one metric – the avoidance of diabetic limb amputations.

A ranking of individual hospitals around the world, published by Newsweek in March 2022, no NHS hospital was listed within the top 40.  St Thomas' Hospital was ranked at 41, followed by University College Hospital at 54, and Addenbrooke's Hospital at 79.

Overall satisfaction with the NHS in 2021 fell, more sharply in Scotland than in England, 17 points to 36% – the lowest level since 1997 according to the British Social Attitudes Survey. Dissatisfaction with hospital and GP waiting times were the biggest cause of the fall.

The NHS Confederation polled 182 health leaders and 9 in 10 warned that inadequate capital funding harmed their “ability to meet safety requirements for patients” in health settings including hospitals, ambulance, community and mental health services and GP practices.

See also Health system#Health systems performance

Opinion polls and other opinions
In 2016 it was reported that there appeared to be support for higher taxation to pay for extra spending on the NHS as an opinion poll in 2016 showed that 70% of people were willing to pay an extra penny in the pound in income tax if the money were ringfenced and guaranteed for the NHS. Two thirds of respondents to a King's Fund poll, reported in September 2017, favoured increased taxation to help finance the NHS.

A YouGov poll reported in May 2018 showed that 74% of the UK public believed there were too few nurses.

The trade union, Unite, said in March 2019 that the NHS had been under pressure as a result of economic austerity. 

A 2018 public survey reported that public satisfaction with the NHS had fallen from 70% in 2010 to 53% in 2018. The NHS is consistently ranked as the institution that makes people proudest to be British, beating the Royal family, Armed Forces and the BBC. One 2019 survey ranked nurses and doctors – not necessarily NHS staff – amongst the most trustworthy professions in the UK.

In November 2022 a survey by Ipsos and the Health Foundation found just a third of respondents agreed the NHS gave a good service nationally, and 82% thought the NHS needed more funding. 62% expected care standards to fall during the following 12 months. Sorting out pressure and workload on staff and increasing staff numbers were the chief priorities the poll found. Improving A&E waiting times and routine services were also concerns. Just 10% of UK respondents felt their government had the correct plans for the NHS. The Health Foundation stated in spite of these concerns, the public is committed to the founding principles of the NHS and 90% of respondents believe the NHS should be free, 89% believe NHS should provide a comprehensive service for everyone, and 84% believe the NHS should be funded mainly through taxation.

Role in combating coronavirus pandemic

In 2020, the NHS issued medical advice in combating COVID-19 and partnered with tech companies to create computer dashboards to help combat the nation's coronavirus pandemic. During the pandemic, the NHS also established integrated COVID into its 1-1-1 service line as well. Following his discharge from the St. Thomas' Hospital in London on 13 April 2020 after being diagnosed with COVID-19, British Prime Minister Boris Johnson described NHS medical care as "astonishing" and said that the "NHS saved my life. No question." In this time, the NHS underwent major re-organisation to prepare for the COVID-19 pandemic.

On 5 July 2021, Queen Elizabeth II awarded the NHS the George Cross. The George Cross, the highest award for gallantry available to civilians and is slightly lower in stature to the Victoria Cross, is bestowed for acts of the greatest heroism or most conspicuous courage. In a handwritten note the Queen said the award was being made to all NHS staff past and present for their “courage, compassion and dedication” throughout the pandemic.

Hospital beds
In 2015, the UK had 2.6 hospital beds per 1,000 people. In September 2017, the King's Fund documented the number of NHS hospital beds in England as 142,000, describing this as less than 50% of the number 30 years previously. In 2019 one tenth of the beds in the UK were occupied by a patient who was alcohol-dependent.

NHS music releases
NHS charity songs under various choir names have become a tradition (usually at Christmas time but not necessarily) and various formation carrying the name of NHS have released singles including:
 2015: National Health Singers - "Yours"
 2015: NHS Choir - "A Bridge Over You" (being a mashup of "Bridge Over Troubled Water" and "Fix You")
 2018: NHS Voices - "With a Little Help from My Friends"
 2018: National Health Singers - "NHS 70: Won't Let Go"
 2020: NHS and keyworkers - "You'll Never Walk Alone"

See also
 History of the NHS England
 History of NHS Scotland
 History of NHS Wales
 Private providers of NHS services

General
 Health care in the United Kingdom
 Health in the United Kingdom

Notes

References

Further reading

 Brady, Robert A. Crisis in Britain. Plans and Achievements of the Labour Government (1950) pp. 352–41 excerpt
 Gorsky, Martin. "The British National Health Service 1948–2008: A Review of the Historiography," Social History of Medicine, Dec 2008, Vol. 21 Issue 3, pp. 437–60
 Hacker, Jacob S. "The Historical Logic of National Health Insurance: Structure and Sequence in the Development of British, Canadian, and U.S. Medical Policy," Studies in American Political Development, April 1998, Vol. 12 Issue 1, pp. 57–130.
 Hilton, Claire. (26 August 2016). Whistle-blowing in the National Health Service since the 1960s History and Policy. Retrieved 11 May 2017.
 Loudon, Irvine, John Horder and Charles Webster. General Practice under the National Health Service 1948–1997 (1998) online
 Rintala, Marvin. Creating the National Health Service: Aneurin Bevan and the Medical Lords (2003) online.
 Rivett G. C. From Cradle to Grave: The First 50 (65) Years of the NHS. King's Fund, London, 1998 now updated to 2014 and available at www.nhshistory.co.uk
 Stewart, John. "The Political Economy of the British National Health Service, 1945–1975: Opportunities and Constraints", Medical History, October 2008, Vol. 52, Issue 4, pp. 453–70.
 Webster, Charles. "Conflict and Consensus: Explaining the British Health Service", Twentieth Century British History, April 1990, Vol. 1 Issue 2, pp. 115–51
 Webster, Charles. Health Services Since the War. Vol. 1: Problems of Health Care. The National Health Service before 1957 (1988) 479pp online

External links 

 Official website of the NHS in England
 Official website of NHS Scotland
 Official website of NHS Wales
 Official website of Health and Social Care in Northern Ireland

 
1948 establishments in the United Kingdom
Medical and health organisations based in the United Kingdom
Organizations established in 1948
Collective recipients of the George Cross